Rishworth is a  village in Calderdale, West Yorkshire, England. Historically part of the West Riding of Yorkshire, it has a small church, farms and schools, including Rishworth School.

St. Johns Rishworth CofE Primary School provides primary-level education for children in Rishworth and Ripponden. The school is a Church of England school, with classes making regular trips to the village's church situated on Godley Lane.

Former railway

Rishworth was the terminus of the Rishworth Branch of the Lancashire and Yorkshire Railway from Sowerby Bridge. It opened in 1881 and closed to passengers in 1929.

See also
Listed buildings in Ripponden

References

Villages in West Yorkshire
Ripponden